AP1 or AP-1 may refer to:

Biology
 Activator protein 1, dimeric transcription factor
 Adaptor protein 1, tetrameric clathrin-associated complex

Transportation
 Autopista AP-1, a Spanish motorway
 Caproni A.P.1, a 1934 Italian attack aircraft monoplane
 USS Henderson (AP-1)

Other uses
 Protocol I, or AP 1, a 1977 amendment to the Geneva Conventions

See also
 API (disambiguation)